Taxon is a bimonthly peer-reviewed scientific journal covering plant taxonomy. It is published by Wiley on behalf of the International Association for Plant Taxonomy, of which it is the official journal. It was established in 1952 and is the only place where nomenclature proposals and motions to amend the International Code of Nomenclature for algae, fungi, and plants (except for the rules concerning fungi) can be published. The editor-in-chief is Dirk C. Albach (University of Oldenburg).

Abstracting and indexing
The journal is abstracted and indexed in:

According to the Journal Citation Reports, the journal has a 2020 impact factor of 2.817.

References

External links

Botany journals
Wiley (publisher) academic journals
Bimonthly journals
English-language journals
Publications established in 1952